Local Adaptation Plans of Action (LAPAs) are community-based approaches that take a "vulnerability first" approach to climate change adaptation. LAPAs contrast with National Adaptation Programme of Action (NAPAs) in their bottom-up, local approach, but in some cases are funded under the similar development assistance schemes. LAPAs are often prepared at local government level, although community-based LAPAs are also in place. The practice was initiated in Nepal under the guidance of the Ministry of Population and Environment, the national focal point to United Nations Framework Convention on Climate Change. 

Climate change policy
Action plans